Gravataí River is a river that runs along Gravataí (a city located in the metropolitan area of Porto Alegre city).

Rivers of Rio Grande do Sul